Rocco Lurago (died 1590) was an Italian architect, active in Genoa in the 16th century.

He was born in Pelsopra, and moved to Genoa as a young man. He designed the Palazzo Doria-Tursi, adjacent to the Palazzo Bianco which now belongs to the city. He designed the Dominican monastery in Bosco Marengo for Pope Pius V. Francesco da Novi was his pupil.

Sources

1590 deaths
16th-century Italian architects
16th-century Genoese people
Year of birth unknown
Architects from Genoa
People from the Province of Como